Dacai Township is a township in Huanjiang Maonan Autonomous County, Guangxi, China.

Administrative division
As of 2021, the township is divided into one community and six villages: 
Dacai Community
Tongjin
Xinpo
Dama
Nuanhuo
Sanhe
Chonglou

History
The area used to be in the territory of Tang Empire (618–907). In 1075, in the ruling of Emperor Shenzong of Song dynasty (907–1279), it was merged into Si'en County.

In 1933 during the Republic of China, Tianshi Township was set up.

In 1958, the "Dacai Red Flag People's Commune" was founded and one year later renamed Chengguan People's Commune". In 1962, its name was changed to Chengguan District. It was incorporated as a township in 1984.

Geography
The township lies at the eastern of Huanjiang Maonan Autonomous County, bordering Si'en Town to the west, Da'an Township to the north, and Yizhou District to the east and south.

Climate

Economy
The local economy is primarily based upon agriculture. Significant crops include rice and corn. Sugarcane is one of the important economic crops in the region.

Demographics

The 2019 census showed the township's population to be 13,440, an increase of 5.1% from the 2011 census.

Transportation
The Provincial Highway S205 passes across the southwestern township.

Tourist attractions
Longjiao Temple is a Buddhist temple in the township.

References

Bibliography

 

Divisions of Huanjiang Maonan Autonomous County